Kasaragod district is endowed with 9 rivers (out of a total of the 44 rivers that flow in Kerala), hills, beaches, backwaters, as well as temples, churches, mosques and forts.

 Bekal Fort - 15  km from Kasaragod Town. 
 Chandragiri Fort located 8 km from town.
 Malik Deenar Mosque, a holy mosque situated at Thalangara near by the Kasaragod railway station.
 Ananthapura Lake Temple, an ancient temple dedicated to Lord Vishnu. 
 Ranipuram - A Hill station of grassy hills near Panathady Town and linked to Kanhangad by Kanhangad-Panathur-Madikeri  highway.
 Kottancheri Hills - Located near Malom, 45  km from Kanhangad Town.
 Arikady fort
 Mayipady Palace  
Edayilekkadu

Pilgrim centres 
 Madhur Ganapathy Temple
 Mallik Deenar Mosque, is located approximately 0.5 km from Kasaragod railway station.
 Bela Church, also known as Our Lady of Sorrows Church, is a Roman Catholic church located 14 km north of Kasaragod and 50 km south of Mangalore. 

Tourist attractions in Kasaragod district